WTQR (104.1 FM, "Q104.1") is a country music station licensed to Winston-Salem, North Carolina and serves the Piedmont Triad region, including Greensboro and High Point. Owned and operated by iHeartMedia, the station broadcasts at 104.1 MHz with an ERP of 100 kW.  It has studio facilities and offices located on Pai Park in Greensboro, and a transmitter site is located atop Sauratown Mountain near Pinnacle, North Carolina.  They are one of three country music outlets in the market; WPAW and WBRF are the others.

History
WSJS-FM began broadcasting December 1, 1947, on 104.1 MHz with full effective radiated power of 48 KW. It was licensed to Piedmont Publishing Company.

WSJS-FM played classical and semi-classical music after the owners of WAAA purchased WYFS, and offered an easy listening format until 1974.

WSJS, WSJS-FM and WSJS-TV had been owned by Piedmont Publishing, owners of The Winston-Salem Journal and The Twin City Sentinel, Winston-Salem's two newspapers, until 1969. Gordon Gray, who had owned the newspapers and the broadcast stations, wanted to sell the FM station. However, Roger Stockton believed in the future of FM while most people did not. Stockton spent 22 years at WSJS and WTQR, starting by selling commercials, and was WSJS sales manager by 1969. WSJS was number one in the Triad, and management feared losing that status if the FM became popular. Curly Howard of WKBX told Stockton he should do country on FM, and Summit Communications president Lee Wallenhaupt and executive vice president Richard Barron supported letting Stockton take the FM station in a new direction. For one thing, country music was changing from a "twangy" sound to one based on orchestras. Stockton sold national advertising but aired it for free at first, charging advertisers once the station proved itself. By 1976, WTQR was number one in the market, though WSJS held on to the top spot among AMs. Stockton became vice president and general manager of the radio stations in 1979, staying until the stations were sold.

In January 1987, Summit Communications Inc. was in the process of selling WSJS and WTQR.

In Fall 1989, WTQR was still number one as usual in the Arbitron ratings, but not by as large a margin as before.

Dale Mitchell and Aunt Eloise (revealed in 2008 to be Toby Young), morning hosts on WTQR for three years, were nominated for Country Music Association Broadcast Personality of the Year in 1990. Before discussing "everything from politics to 'possums" they would bang pots and pans. Billy Buck was Aunt Eloise's partner before moving to WBIG. "Big Paul" Franklin and Aunt Eloise, who teamed up in 1994, won the CMA Morning Show of the Year award (large markets) in 1997, and WTQR won Station of the Year (large markets) in 1998 and 2002. In March 1998, Big Paul and Aunt Eloise began airing their show on WSOC-FM in Charlotte, North Carolina. some shows were done from Winston-Salem, and some from Charlotte. The pairing lasted less than a year. Big Paul, whose real name was Paul Fuller Jr., died in a motorcycle crash May 16, 2002 on Highway 64 outside Asheboro, North Carolina. "Brother Bill" Dotson and Aunt Eloise were nominated for a CMA award in 2005. Aunt Eloise dismissed in 2008, replaced by Jeff Roper and Angie Ward, who were nominated for Academy of Country Music  and Country Music Association broadcast personalities of the year (large markets) in 2009. Despite critical accolades, "Jeff Roper In The Morning" ratings in key demographics began to deteriorate. Jeff Roper resigned in February 2012 after his show had consistently lost to the market's competing country morning show at WPAW.

NewMarket Media Corp. sold WSJS and WTQR to Radio Equity Partners of Norwalk, Connecticut, in a deal completed in April 1994 and worth in excess of $100 million, as the Connecticut company expanded into the Southeast, looking for the best stations possible. Later in 1994, Radio Equity Partners also bought WNEU, switching that station from country to modern rock. In 1998, iHeartMedia (then known as Clear Channel Communications) bought WSJS, WTQR and WSML. That company's purchase of AMFM Inc. added WMFR, WMAG and the market's other country radio station, WHSL, in 2000, though Clear Channel sold WMFR, WSJS, and WSML to Infinity Broadcasting. At the end of 2000, WHSL and WXRA traded frequencies, and WXRA became WWCC, a more classic-leaning station than WTQR; that station changed from country early in 2003. Also at the end of 2000, WTQR moved from Winston-Salem to Greensboro, the last commercial FM to do so.

In Spring 1995, although still number one with all listeners 12 and over, WTQR lost to WKZL among listeners ages 25 to 54 in the morning. A year later, WKZL did it again, this time also winning with the same age group for all daytime hours. In Fall 1996, WTQR lost to WQMG among the 25-to-54 audience. WTQR finally lost its top position (to WJMH) among all listeners in Fall 1998, for the first time since Greensboro, High Point and Winston-Salem became one market in the 1970s. In Spring 2008, WTQR was no longer the number one country station among all listeners, having been replaced by WPAW, which went country in October 2006.

On August 5, 2011 at exactly 1:04 PM EDT, WTQR relaunched as Q104.1, with the commitment to play more contemporary country music. The station had been "under construction" for most of the summer, and a relaunch/rebranding had been in the works. Changes included  Angie Ward as the lone holdover after the relaunch, moving from mornings to midday. David Dean joined the station in January 2012 as APD/afternoon host. Tige & Daniel joined in April 2012 for mornings. Evenings are hosted by Dusty.

By February 2012 WTQR had climbed into a virtual dead heat with WPAW for the country crown among adults P25-54.  In July WTQR pulled into the lead where it remains.

Sports programs
WTQR was a local affiliate for NASCAR Sprint Cup Series racing, carrying MRN events & programs until 2011, and PRN events & programs until 2000.

References

External links

Country radio stations in the United States
TQR
Radio stations established in 1958
IHeartMedia radio stations
1958 establishments in North Carolina